Tobaccoville is an unincorporated rural hamlet in Powhatan County, Virginia. Tobaccoville was a stop on the Farmville and Powhatan Railroad from 1884 to 1905 and then on the Tidewater and Western Railroad from 1905 to 1917. A magazine notice for renting the "Indian Camp" farm advertised that the farm was near the Tobaccoville station of the Tidewater and Western Railroad. This would help the tenant farmer get dairy products to market. Since 1918, Tobaccoville is on Virginia State Route 13 at the T-intersection with Clement Town Road, between Powhatan, Virginia and Cumberland, Virginia. It consists of a convenience store with gasoline pumps and a volunteer fire department station, along with several houses and farmland.

References

Unincorporated communities in Virginia
Unincorporated communities in Powhatan County, Virginia